Selected Ambient Works is the name of two ambient albums released in the early 1990s by Richard D. James (under the Aphex Twin moniker):

Selected Ambient Works 85–92 (1992), commonly abbreviated as SAW 85-92 or SAW I
Selected Ambient Works Volume II (1994), commonly abbreviated as SAW II